BBTM may stand for:
Beauty Behind the Madness, album by the Weeknd
 Blood bank and transfusion medicine, when referred to in conjunction with each other
 Béton bitumineux très mince – type of European (French) asphalt concrete